Sacred Heart High School is a private Roman Catholic junior-senior high school in Salina, Kansas. It is in the Roman Catholic Diocese of Salina.

Extracurricular activities

Athletics
Sacred Heart is a member of the Kansas State High School Activities Association. The school has won 40 state championships in various sports. The school offers numerous sports.

High school sports
 Baseball
 Basketball
 Bowling
 Cross country
 Football
 Golf (boys)
 Softball
 Tennis (girls)
 Track & field
 Volleyball

Junior high sports
 Basketball
 Cross country
 Football
 Track & field
 Volleyball

State championships

Clubs/Organizations
Sacred Heart offers many clubs and organizations to the students, sponsored by the teachers.

 Student council
 Yearbook
 Junior Civitan
 Spirit team
 Scholar's bowl
 National Honor Society
 Debate/public speaking
 Chorus
 Culture and diversity club
 Instrumental music
 Annual play/musical
 Publicity
 Relay for Life
 Art competition
 Mathcounts
 Foreign language
 Seatbelts Are For Everyone (SAFE)

Notable alumni
 Kurt Budke, former NCAA coach for Oklahoma State University Cowgirls
 Todd Jadlow, former college and professional basketball player
 Pat Meares, former MLB player for Minnesota Twins, Pittsburgh Pirates

See also
 List of high schools in Kansas
 List of unified school districts in Kansas

References

External links
 School Website

Roman Catholic Diocese of Salina
Catholic secondary schools in Kansas
Education in Salina, Kansas
Educational institutions established in 1908
1908 establishments in Kansas
Sisters of Saint Joseph schools